was a Japanese artist. He was an Imperial Household Artist from 1917 until his death in 1931.

Biography
Kobori was born on 26 March 1864 in Konaka, Hatagawa Village, Aso District, Shimotsuke Province (now part of Sano, in Tochigi Prefecture) in the Empire of Japan.

He was appointed as an Imperial Household Artist on 17 June 1917, a position which he held until his death.

He died on 1 October 1931.

Bibliography and works about him
 (October 2019, Yoshizawa Memorial Museum of Art, 80 pages, no ISBN)

Reception and legacy
Kobori was named as an influence by artist Tetsuya Noguchi.

References

1864 births
1931 deaths
19th-century Japanese painters
20th-century Japanese painters
Artists from Tochigi Prefecture
Male painters
Nihonga painters